The 2009–10 Richmond Spiders men's basketball team represented the University of Richmond in National Collegiate Athletic Association (NCAA) Division I college basketball during the 2009–10 season. Richmond competed as a member of the Atlantic 10 Conference (A-10) under fifth-year head basketball coach Chris Mooney and played its home games at the Robins Center.

Coming off a 20–16 performance in the 2008–09 season that saw the Spiders advance to the semifinals of the 2009 College Basketball Invitational, the Spiders were picked third in the Atlantic-10 preseason poll.  Point guard Kevin Anderson was named to the Preseason All-Atlantic 10 First Team, with guard David Gonzalvez being named to the Second Team and center Dan Geriot to the Third Team.

Following the end of the regular season, Anderson was named Atlantic 10 Player of the Year, while Gonzalvez was named to both the All-Atlantic 10 Second Team and Defensive Team.

With its 26th win of the season coming in the semifinals of the Atlantic 10 tournament against Xavier, Richmond tied a school record for number of wins in a season.

After finishing in third place in the Atlantic 10 during the regular season, Richmond advanced to the finals of the conference tournament before falling to Temple.  Richmond was awarded an at-large bid to the 2010 NCAA Division I men's basketball tournament.  As the seventh seed in the tournament's South region, Richmond earned the highest seeding in its history. They lost in the first round to ten seed Saint Mary's to end their season.

Preseason

Recruiting

Roster

Schedule

|-
!colspan=9 style=| Regular Season

|-
!colspan=9 style=| Atlantic 10 tournament

|-
!colspan=10 style=| NCAA tournament

References

Richmond Spiders men's basketball seasons
Richmond
Richmond
Richmond
Richmond